Armand Huberty (born 16 August 1930) is a Luxembourgian gymnast. He competed at the 1952 Summer Olympics and the 1960 Summer Olympics.

References

1930 births
Living people
Luxembourgian male artistic gymnasts
Olympic gymnasts of Luxembourg
Gymnasts at the 1952 Summer Olympics
Gymnasts at the 1960 Summer Olympics
Sportspeople from Esch-sur-Alzette
20th-century Luxembourgian people